Peter J. Coleman is an American competitive sailor. Peter and his brothers Paul Coleman and Gerard grew up in Larchmont, New York close to Horseshoe Harbour and entered into sailing as Team Coleman.

Early life
Peter and Paul were both students at New York Maritime College, and after competing in the 1976 Olympic trials for 470, teamed up with Gerard in the Soling. Coleman has competed in the J/24, Soling and Etchells classes.

Sailing career
He is a North American Champion, and, with his brothers Paul and Gerard, has missed qualifying for the Olympics five separate times. He competed with Paul in the United States Sailing Championship at the 1983 Mallory Cup, and won the gold medal.

See also
US Sailing

References

External links
 http://articles.baltimoresun.com/1992-02-12/news/9213001403_1_soling-class-miami-olympic-olympic-classes-regatta

American male sailors (sport)
Living people
Soling class sailors
Year of birth missing (living people)